Maja Lidia Korwin-Kossakowska-Grzędowicz (27 February 1972 – 23 May 2022) was a Polish fantasy writer. She was first published in 1997. She was nominated eight times for the Janusz A. Zajdel Award for her short stories and novels, and received it in 2007 for the short story Smok tańczy dla Chung Fonga. She also received several other awards. She is best known for using angel themes in her work. She was the author of thirteen books and many short stories.

She was the wife of another fantasy writer, Jarosław Grzędowicz. She died on 23 May 2022 in a house fire at the age of 50.

References

External links 
 Maja Lidia Kossakowska, biography at Runa Publishing House
 Maja Lidia Kossakowska, biography at gildia.pl
 Maja Lidia Kossakowska, biography at ksiazki.wp.pl

1972 births
2022 deaths
Polish fantasy writers
Polish science fiction writers
University of Warsaw alumni
Writers from Warsaw
Deaths from fire
Women science fiction and fantasy writers
20th-century Polish writers
20th-century short story writers
20th-century Polish women writers
21st-century Polish novelists
21st-century Polish women writers
21st-century short story writers
Polish women novelists
Polish women short story writers